Mordellistena nigrispinosa is a species of beetle in the genus Mordellistena of the family Mordellidae. It was described by Ermisch in 1953.

References

Beetles described in 1953
nigrispinosa